Regeneration is an outdoor 1975 concrete sculpture designed by Alan Collins, located on the Andrews University campus in Berrien Springs, Michigan, United States.

Description and history
Regeneration was designed by Alan Collins in 1971, specifically for the patio of Andrews University's Science Complex. Andrews offers the following description: "The looping, curving ribbon resembles the joining and division of molecules, the intricately twisted DNA molecule, or the form of a mandorla, a medieval symbol of Jesus Christ. At no point does the ribbon ever touch itself in its course, suggesting the course of life. The four forms extending out to passersby represent the four primitive elements—earth, air, water and fire—in subject (horizontal) forms at Jesus' Second coming." The sculpture's unveiling was intended to coincide with the Science Complex's dedication, but was delayed until the fall of 1975.

See also
 1975 in art
 Legacy of Leadership (1998), another sculpture by Collins at Andrews University

References

1975 establishments in Michigan
1975 sculptures
Andrews University
Buildings and structures in Berrien County, Michigan
Concrete sculptures in the United States
Outdoor sculptures in Michigan